Cahul (also known by other alternative names) is a city and municipality in southern Moldova. The city is the administrative center of Cahul District; it also administers one village, Cotihana. As of 2014 census, the city has had a population of 30,018.

Etymology and names
The city of Cahul is believed to have been inhabited for many centuries, although it has had a number of different names over the years – the name Scheia (Old Romanian for "Bulgarian") was recorded in 1502, and the name Frumoasa ("Beautiful" in Romanian) was recorded in 1716. The modern name was given to the settlement after the Battle of Kagul, which was fought nearby.

History

The city's location had made it a frequent battleground for a number of armies, with possession of frequently switching between countries such as Principality of Moldavia, Russian Empire, Ottoman Empire.

The city was a part of the Moldavia before 1812, then Russia from 1812 to 1856, then again Moldavia/Romanian Principalities (1856–1878), then Russia again (1878–1918), then Romania again (1918–1940), then the Soviet Union (1940–1941), then again Romania, the Soviet Union again (1944–1991) and finally Moldova (1991 to the present).

Apart from the battles that have been fought over it, Cahul is also known for its thermal spas and for its folk music.

Climate
Cahul has a humid continental-type climate (Köppen climate classification "Dfb" – summer wetter than winter, European subtype) with  four distinct seasons. Average monthly precipitation ranges from about 28 mm (1.1 in) in October to 76 mm (3 in) in June.

Demographics
As of 1920, the population was estimated to be 12,000. Groups settled in the area included Romanians, Jewish, Germans, Bulgarians, and Greeks.

In 2004 there were 35,488 people living within the city of Cahul (making it the sixth largest city in Moldova) and 1,317 people within Cotihana. Of the 30,018 living in the city according to the 2014 Moldovan Census, 56.1% are Moldovans, 10.7% Russians, 6.8% Ukrainians, 4.9% Bulgarians, 4.4% Romanians, and 2.1% ethnic Gagauz (there is an ongoing controversy regarding the ethnic identification of Moldovans and Romanians).

Culture
 
Cahul is home to the Cahul Musical-Drama Theatre, Cahul History Museum, and other public institutions and monuments. Every two years, at the beginning of July, in Cahul takes place an important folk music festival, "Nufărul Alb" ("White waterlilies").

Media
 Ziuadeazi.md
 dincahul.md

Tourism
Cahul is also a destination as spa and health resort. The city and surrounding areas are richest with mineral springs enriched with bromine and iodine. The "Nufărul Alb" Balneotherapy and Well-being Centre consists of hospital, hotel and entertaining spots. Cahul has a tourist information point located at the Piata Horelor.

Education
Cahul is home to the State University of Cahul, opened in 1999 and named after Romanian writer and philologist Bogdan Petriceicu Hasdeu. The university is made up of 3 faculties (Philology – History, Law – Public Administration and Business – Computer Science – Mathematics) with around 2,150 students.

Sport
The city has the team of FC Cahul-2005 who play in Moldovan "A" Division. The club won 4 times the Divizia B in 2006–07, 2012–13, 2014–15 and 2016–17. In the city plays also the club FC Speranța Crihana Veche.

Transport

Road
Cahul is connected by national roads with Chișinău, Giurgiulești, Oancea (Romania) and Reni (Ukraine). Cahul is also a border checkpoint to Romania.

Rail
The railway station serves the city and is operated by Moldovan Railways. It provides direct rail connections to Chișinău.

Air
The city is served by the Cahul International Airport located 8 km south-east of the city centre. Currently, the airport has no scheduled flights.

Twin towns – sister cities

Cahul is twinned with:
 Medgidia, Romania
 Vaslui, Romania

Consulates in Cahul
In Cahul is located one of the two Consulates General of Romania in Moldova. On 2 November 2009 the President of Romania Traian Băsescu has signed the decrees on opening of Romanian general consulat in Cahul. "The opening of the Romanian consulates in Bălți and Cahul will be beneficial for the Moldovan people, who have encountered economic and time-related problems as they have to travel to the consulate in Chișinău," Moldova's Foreign Minister Iurie Leancă said, commenting on the Băsescu's decree.

Romania asked the approval for the opening of the consulate as early as in 2006, in order to easy thus the process of granting visas to the Moldovan citizens more easily, after Romania's accession with the European Union on 1 January 2007. Initially, the communist authorities in Chişinău gave their approval for the opening of the two consular offices, but they later came with the condition Romania to accept two consular offices of the Republic of Moldova on its territory too, in Iaşi and Constanţa. Moreover, the former communist rule in Chişinău conditioned the signing of the small border traffic agreement on the signing of the Basic Political Treaty between the two countries and also of the agreement referring to the delimitation of the border.

On 28 January 2010, Traian Băsescu visited the future headquarters of the Romanian consulate in Cahul. Speaking about the opening of the two Romanian consulates in Bălți and Cahul, Băsescu said that the consulate in Cahul could be opened in 2–3 weeks.

The consulate has 17 employees: Consul General, two consuls, two main consular officers, six major referers, two drivers, two skilled workers and two guards. The Consul General is Ms. Anca Corfu.

Notable people 

 Alexandru Cecal (1940-2021), chemist and professor at Alexandru Ioan Cuza University

References

External links

 Cahul City Hall website
 Official Webpage of Cahul's Festivals
 Oraşele şi satele Moldovei: Cahul 

 
Cities and towns in Moldova
Municipalities of Moldova
Moldova–Romania border crossings
Izmailsky Uyezd
Cahul County (Romania)
Capitals of the counties of Bessarabia
Cahul District
Populated places on the Prut